Ville Varakas (born February 13, 1984) is a Finnish professional ice hockey defenceman. He is currently playing with HIFK of the Liiga.

Varakas made his SM-liiga debut playing with HIFK during the 2003–04 SM-liiga season.

References

External links

1984 births
Living people
Djurgårdens IF Hockey players
Espoo Blues players
Finnish ice hockey defencemen
HIFK (ice hockey) players
KalPa players
Lahti Pelicans players
HC Olomouc players
Vaasan Sport players
Växjö Lakers players
Ice hockey people from Helsinki
Finnish expatriate ice hockey players in Sweden
Finnish expatriate ice hockey players in the Czech Republic